Vojislav Budimirović (Serbian Cyrillic: Војислав Будимировић; born 4 January 1968) is a Serbian footballer who plays in sixth league Serbia for FK Gorki Glušci as football forward.

In his career, he played for FK Gorki Glušci, Mačva Šabac, Bulgarian Lokomotiv Plovdiv, Čukarički and Cypriot Apollon Limassol. He is one of the first Serbians to make appearances in the A PFG.

Honours
Individual
First League of FR Yugoslavia Top scorer: 1995–96

References

External links

1968 births
Living people
Sportspeople from Šabac
Yugoslav footballers
Serbian footballers
Serbian expatriate footballers
Association football forwards
FK Mačva Šabac players
PFC Lokomotiv Plovdiv players
FK Čukarički players
Apollon Limassol FC players
First Professional Football League (Bulgaria) players
Cypriot First Division players
Expatriate footballers in Bulgaria
Expatriate footballers in Cyprus